Balesar Satan is a village in Jodhpur district, Rajasthan, India. It is a panchayat village and headquarters of the Balesar tehsil.

Geography
Balesar is located in the Thar Desert at an elevation of 230 meters above mean sea level. The village is on National Highway 125 between Jodhpur and Jaisalmer.

Demographics
In the 2001 India census, the village of Balesar Satan reported 70,000 inhabitants with 5,087 (%) being male and 4,465 (%) being female, for a gender ratio of 920 females per thousand males.

References

External links
 

Villages in Jodhpur district